The Koudiat Acerdoune Dam is a gravity dam located  southwest of Kadiria on the Isser River in Bouïra Province, Algeria. The dam was constructed between 2002 and 2008 with the roller-compacted concrete technique. It serves the purpose of providing water for industrial, irrigation and municipal uses.

External links

References

Dams in Algeria
Gravity dams
Buildings and structures in Bouïra Province
Dams completed in 2008
Roller-compacted concrete dams
21st-century architecture in Algeria